Shanta Kumar  twice became chief minister of Himachal Pradesh, India, the first time from 22 June 1977 to 14 February 1980. His ministry was:

Cabinet ministers
 Shanta Kumar - Chief minister
 Devi Singh
 Kishori Lal
 Jagdev Chand
 Bachitter Singh
 Daulat Ram Chauhan
 Nagin Chandra Pal

Minister of state
 Kunj Lal Thakur
 Shyama Sharma

See also
 Shanta Kumar ministry (1990–92)

References

1970s in Himachal Pradesh
1980s in Himachal Pradesh
1977 in Indian politics
Shanta Kumar 01
Janata Party state ministries
1977 establishments in Himachal Pradesh
1980 disestablishments in India
Cabinets established in 1977
Cabinets disestablished in 1980